Suppressor of SWI4 1 homolog is a protein that in humans is encoded by the PPAN gene.

The protein encoded by this gene is an evolutionarily conserved protein similar to yeast SSF1 as well as to the gene product of the Drosophila gene peter pan (PPAN). SSF1 is known to be involved in the second step of mRNA splicing. Both SSF1 and PPAN are essential for cell growth and proliferation. This gene was found to cotranscript with P2RY11/P2Y(11), an immediate downstream gene on the chromosome that encodes an ATP receptor. The chimeric transcripts of this gene and P2RY11 were found to be ubiquitously present and regulated during granulocytic differentiation. Exogenous expression of this gene was reported to reduce the anchorage-independent growth of some tumor cells.

Although being involved in ribosome biogenesis, human PPAN is not merely localized in nucleoli, but also in mitochondria. Depletion of PPAN provokes apoptosis as observed by increased amounts of p53 and its target gene p21, BAX-driven depolarisation of mitochondria, cytochrome c release as well as caspase-dependent cleavage of PARP. Recent studies revealed that PPAN participates in the regulation of mitochondrial homeostasis, presumably via modulation of autophagy. Furthermore, PPAN is required for proper cycling of cells since down regulation of PPAN in cancer cells results in a p53-independent cell cycle arrest.

One of the introns of PPAN encodes the Small nucleolar RNA SNORD105.

References

Further reading